Feride Hanımsultan ("unique"; 30 May 1847 – December 1920) was an Ottoman princess, the daughter of Atiye Sultan and Ahmed Fethi Pasha and the granddaughter of the Ottoman Sultan Mahmud II.

Biography
Feride Hanımsultan was born on 30 May 1847. Her father was Ahmed Fethi Pasha, son of Rodoslu Hafız Ahmed Agha and Saliha Hanım, and her mother was Atiye Sultan, daughter of Sultan Mahmud II and Pervizifelek Kadın. She had a full sister, Seniye Hanımsultan, three years elder than her. She also had five paternal half-siblings, brothers Mehmed Besim Bey and Damat Mahmud Celaleddin Pasha, who married Cemile Sultan, daughter of Sultan Abdulmejid I, and sisters, Ferdane Hanım, Saliha Yeğane Hanım and Emine Güzide Hanım.

After their mother's death in 1850, Feride and Seniye came of the possession of their mother's palace in Emirgan, while Atiye's palace in Arnavutköy was allocated for the guests, who visited the empire. Later their palace in Emirgan was given to the governor of Egypt, and the two of them were allocated to the villa of Rıza Pasha. Later the two of them came of the possession of the palace in Arnavutköy.

In 1868, she married Mahmud Nedim Pasha. The two together had a son, Mehmed Saib Bey, born on 1861, who died on 26 November 1871. She was widowed at his death in 1904. In 1912, the "Hilal-i Ahmer Centre for Women" was organized within the "Ottoman Hilal-i Ahmer Association", a foundation established in 1877 to provide medical care in Istanbul and surrounding communities. As a member of the foundation, Feride was obliged to give the foundation 1500 kuruş every year.

Feride died in December 1920, and was buried in Yahya Efendi Cemetery, Istanbul.

Honour
Order of the House of Osman

Issue

Ancestry

References

1847 births
1920 deaths
Royalty from Istanbul
19th-century Ottoman princesses
20th-century Ottoman princesses